Adriana Cardoso de Castro (born 29 October 1990) is a Brazilian handballer for ŽRK Budućnost Podgorica and the Brazilian national team.

Achievements
Danish League:
Winner: 2011/12
Spanish División de Honor Femenina:
Winner: 2012/13, 2013/14, 2017/18, 2019/20, 2020/21. 
 Copa de la Reina de Balonmano:
Winner: 2012/13, 2013/14, 2018/19. 
 Runner-up: 2017/18
 2019 Intersport Cup: Top scorer
2022 Intersport Cup: Top scorer

References

External links

 Adriana Cardoso C. at the 2019 Pan American Games

1990 births
Living people
Brazilian female handball players
Sportspeople from Fortaleza
Expatriate handball players
Brazilian expatriate sportspeople in Denmark
Brazilian expatriate sportspeople in Germany
Brazilian expatriate sportspeople in Spain
Handball players at the 2019 Pan American Games
Pan American Games medalists in handball
Pan American Games gold medalists for Brazil
Medalists at the 2019 Pan American Games
Handball players at the 2020 Summer Olympics
21st-century Brazilian women